"The Lip Reader" is the 70th episode of the sitcom Seinfeld. It is the sixth episode of the fifth season, and first aired on October 28, 1993. In this episode, George gets Jerry's deaf girlfriend to use her lip reading talent to eavesdrop on his own ex-girlfriend and find out the reason why she dumped him. The title character was played by Marlee Matlin.

Plot
Jerry and George are at the US Open. During a break, George buys an ice cream sundae and gets it all over his face, which is broadcast on television and mocked by the commentators. Kramer watches the scene on TV in Jerry's apartment and has a good laugh; he then decides to become a ball boy for the tournament, and excels at the tryouts. Jerry becomes smitten with Laura, a deaf lineswoman. 

Elaine, who is using her company's car service, is tired of having to always make small talk with the drivers. She pretends to have a hearing problem to avoid talking to him but is caught when she reacts to a radio message for the driver to pick up Tom Hanks. When the driver is angry with her for faking deafness, she gets him tickets to a Metallica concert as an apology; however, it causes the driver to temporarily lose his hearing and become even more upset with her.

George's girlfriend Gwen breaks up with him, telling him "it's not you; it's me." George is baffled since he claims he came up with the aforementioned line and insists it's him, not her. Later, Kramer tells George that he saw him on TV at the US Open and latter suspects the real reason for the breakup is that Gwen saw the video of him eating the ice cream and was disgusted. When George finds out that Laura can read lips, he asks her to come with him to a party that he knows Gwen will attend and eavesdrop on conversations to find out the real reason she dumped him.

The gang takes Elaine's car service to the party, and the car is driven by the same driver as Elaine had before. When he recognizes Elaine, the driver throws everyone out of his car. They end up walking to the party, arriving late. During Gwen's conversation with a male friend, Kramer (having learned some sign language from a cousin) interprets for Laura, incorrectly interpreting that Gwen and the male friend are agreeing to "sleep together" instead of "sweep together" after the party. George confronts Gwen and her friend angrily, causing a scene and ruining any chance of reconciliation with Gwen.

Later, the group returns to the US Open to watch Kramer serve as a "ball man" at the first match of Monica Seles' comeback (from her stabbing injury). However, soon into the match, Kramer runs into Seles, injuring her and putting an end to Kramer's service. After the match, Laura gets into the limo with the same chatty driver. When he starts talking to her, she explains to him that she's deaf. He gives her a dubious expression, thinking she is faking it like Elaine.

Production
"The Lip Reader" was writer Carol Leifer's first produced script for Seinfeld. As had become a signature of the show, Leifer drew on her real life experiences for the storylines. While working as a stand-up comedian, Leifer used a car service for traveling between shows; preferring to have "some peace and quiet" during her rides, she was annoyed that she consistently ended up with drivers who would talk to her even when she buried her face in a magazine. She added in Elaine's pretending to be deaf to both tie her plot in with George's and raise the down-to-earth experience of not wanting to talk with drivers to a level of absurdity. Sports commentators ridiculing a spectator who was messily eating a hot fudge sundae was something Leifer actually saw on TV.

In the scene where George comes up with the idea of using Laura to eavesdrop on his ex-girlfriend, Leifer's script had Jerry and George talking out of the sides of their mouths in order to avoid being lip-read by Laura. Actors Jerry Seinfeld and Jason Alexander came up with the idea of using organic gestures to cover their mouths on their own.

Critical reception
David Sims of The A.V. Club gave the episode an A− / B+, calling it "perfectly good but just a little more forgettable than the stone cold classics season five opened with", including "some very memorable moments." Sims notes that much of the episode "makes George look like a fool."

Nick DeNitto remarked that "Laura's lip-reading isn't perfect, which leads to some funny moments of miscommunication."

Commentator Paul Arras praises the episode for its "jokes that take on stereotypes, political correctness, and other assumptions about etiquette." 
While Elaine becomes the foil, Matlin plays the character with such self-confidence and empowerment, it's easy to forget that social etiquette implies her deafness should be cause for pity. In a hilarious scene, Jerry and George out to dinner with Laura, go to great lengths to guard their mouths in natural ways, raising a glass to their face or rubbing their eyes so Laura doesn't know they are talking about her. George, of course, lacks the shame he should be expected to feel about using Laura's skill for his own selfish interests. Jerry is more hesitant, saying, "She's not a novelty act, George, where you hire her out for weddings and bar mitzvahs." Eventually Jerry relents to ask, but before he can, Laura blurts out, "Sure. I'll do it." She's turned the tables and demonstrated her own empowerment. Their attempts to disguise their conversation from her failed. She is too good a lip reader to be outwitted.

References

External links 
 

Seinfeld (season 5) episodes
1993 American television episodes
Deaf culture